"La mamma", also known as "For Mama" in English, is a song written in 1962 by French lyricist Robert Gall and Armenian-French artist Charles Aznavour.

History
Charles Aznavour first recorded "La mamma" for a 1962 EP with his version serving as title cut for his 1963 album release. The first single release was by Les Compagnons de la chanson which reached #80 on the French charts in late 1963: the Aznavour version was then issued as a single to reach #1 in France in February 1964. "La mamma" also afforded Aznavour a hit on the Dutch charts of Belgium and, rendered in Italian, was a hit in Italy for both Aznavour (#13) and also Domenico Modugno (#36). "La mamma" became Aznavour's first million seller.

An English-language rendering of "La mamma" by lyricist Don Black entitled "For Mama" was recorded by Matt Monro and released in December 1964 in the UK where it had a chart peak of #36. "For Mama" became a minor US hit in 1965 for Jerry Vale whose version debuted on the Hot 100 in Billboard magazine dated March 6, 1965 at #88 (Vale): in the previous issue of Billboard, that dated February 27, 1965, the Matt Monro version of "For Mama" had appeared in the "Bubbling Under Hot 100 Singles" chart at #135 along with the Jerry Vale version at #121, but Monro's version did not subsequently advance into the Hot 100. Jerry Vale's version of "For Mama"  rose to a peak of #54 (Vale) on the Hot 100 dated April 3, 1965. Vic Damone also recorded a cover version of "For Mama" which failed to chart.

Connie Francis' version

Connie Francis' recording of "For Mama" was released as a single in 1965 and became a minor hit in the United States, peaking at No. 48 on the Billboard Hot 100. In the Philippines, the single reached No. 2 on the national chart.

Adaptations
La mamma, written by Nelly Byl (Dutch)
La mamma, written by Gerrit den Braber (Dutch)
Mamãe, written by Nazareno de Brito (Portuguese)
For Mama, written by Don Black (English)
Mama, written by Dragutin Britvić (Croatian)
La mamma, written by Mogol (Italian)
La mamma, written by Charly Niessen (German)
Den bompa, written by Leo Rozenstraten (Brabantian dialect of Antwerp)
 Ya yemma, written by Lili Boniche (Algerian Arabic)
La mama, written by Rafael Gayoso, sung by Peret (Spanish) - 1964
Mama, written by Odysseas Ioannou, sung by Vasilis Papakonstantinou (Greek)

Cover versions
Dalida
Matt Monro (For Mama)
De Strangers (Den bompa)
Anna German
Ray Charles (For Mama "La Mamma")
Lisa del Bo
Domenico Modugno
Marla Glen (Our World album, 1997)
Agnaldo Timóteo
Jean Vallée
Demis Roussos
Corry Brokken
Will Tura
Chico & The Gypsies (La mama)
Elvina Makaryan
Isabelle Boulay (2002)
Yoyoy Villame (parody in Cebuano titled "Mamay Maliya")
Heino La mamma (clip)
Dakis Dakis La Mamma

See also
La mamma

References

External links
La mamma (live)

1962 songs
Charles Aznavour songs
Connie Francis songs
Dalida songs
Demis Roussos songs
French songs
Songs about mothers
Songs with lyrics by Robert Gall
Songs written by Charles Aznavour